Everett Eric Lindsay (born September 18, 1970) is a former American college and professional football player who was a guard in the National Football League (NFL) for eleven seasons.  He played college football for the University of Mississippi, and was recognized as an All-American.  He played professionally for the Minnesota Vikings, Baltimore Ravens and Cleveland Browns of the NFL.

Early years
Lindsay was born in Burlington, Iowa, and raised in Raleigh, North Carolina.  He attended Millbrook High School in Raleigh, where he played for the Millbrook Wildcats high school football team.

College career
While attending the University of Mississippi, he played for the Ole Miss Rebels football team from 1989 to 1992.  He was initially a walk-on, but later earned an athletic scholarship and anchored the offensive line under then head coach Billy Brewer.  Lindsay was a first-team All-Southeastern Conference (SEC) selection in 1991 and 1992, and a consensus first-team All-American in 1992.

Professional career
During his eleven NFL seasons, he played in 136 regular season games, started 63 of them, including 32 straight starts for the Ravens and Browns in 1998 and 1999.

References

1970 births
Living people
All-American college football players
American football offensive guards
Baltimore Ravens players
Cleveland Browns players
Minnesota Vikings players
Ole Miss Rebels football players
People from Burlington, Iowa